The 2015 Season is Pune City's 2nd season in existence in the Indian Super League.

Transfers

In:

Out:

Players and staff

Squad

Coaching staff

Indian Super League

League table

Results summary

Results by round

Matches

Squad statistics

Appearances and goals

|-
|}

Goal scorers

Disciplinary record

References

FC Pune City seasons
Pune